"Tumbleweed" is a song written by Kye Fleming and Dennis Morgan, and recorded by American country music artist Sylvia.  It was released in September 1980 as the second single from the album Drifter.  The song reached #10 on the Billboard Hot Country Singles & Tracks chart.

Chart performance

References

1980 singles
Sylvia (singer) songs
Songs written by Kye Fleming
Songs written by Dennis Morgan (songwriter)
Song recordings produced by Tom Collins (record producer)
RCA Records singles
1980 songs